Hummingbird is a fictional superhero from Mexico appearing in American comic books published by Marvel Comics. She made her debut in the 2012 Scarlet Spider comic book series written by Christopher Yost.

Publication history
Created by artist Ryan Stegman and writer Christopher Yost, she first appeared in Scarlet Spider vol. 2 #1. She took on the superhero identity of Hummingbird during Scarlet Spider vol. 2 #17, with artist Carlo Barberi designing her costume.

Along with Kaine, the Scarlet Spider, she joined the New Warriors on the 2014 Volume 5 version of the team.

Fictional character biography
Born as María Aracely Josefina Penalba de las Heras, she is originally from an unspecified location in Mexico. However, she may be the reincarnation of the Aztec God of War Huitzilopochtli and has been labeled as a demigod by the High Evolutionary.

She has no recollection of her life previous to her arrival to Houston, Texas with the exception of the event that took her there: her kidnapping and forced trafficking at the hands of the Lobo Cartel and the singular circumstances of it.

Scarlet Spider

The story of Aracely starts in darkness, among the dead. Buried in a pile of corpses of her fellow passengers and barely alive, she was the only survivor of a botched human trafficking operation by the Lobo Cartel, who had smuggled them from Mexico to Houston's harbor inside a truck's shipping container.

Outside the container, members of Lobo Cartel were discussing with another group the last-minute details of the exchange of money for people – ignorant of the true condition of their "merchandise" – when they were interrupted by an unknown assailant: Kaine, who assumed they were just drug dealers he could steal money from, picked them off one by one. Upon scaring away the criminals and collecting the money that was meant to be the payment, Kaine noticed the odor coming from the metallic crate and opened it, finding within a scene frighteningly similar to one of his earliest memories: a mound of crammed rotting bodies and a person (Aracely) who, just like him back then, clung to life.

Aracely was rushed to the Park Plaza Hospital where, after a brief initial violent misunderstanding, she is placed by Kaine to the care of Dr. Donald Meland and police officer Wally Layton is informed of her situation and of the corpses at the harbor.

She regained consciousness, bereft of her memories, just in time for a flame-manipulating assassin called The Salamander to attack the hospital while searching for her. Aracely fled the Salamander but he cornered her. Amused that she had no idea why he was going to kill her, Salamander prepared to land the final blow but Kaine arrived in a purloined Spider-Man costume and took on the Salamander. After Kaine tackled the villain out of a window and defeated him (an act for which he gained the moniker of Scarlet Spider from the crowd who observed the fight), Aracely returned to her bed to continue her recovery.

That night, she was visited by Kaine, who wanted to ensure she was really okay before continuing his escape route to Mexico. However, compelled by doctor Donald and officer Wally, who reasoned that Aracely would be better off in his hands – as otherwise she would eventually be deported and end up at the mercy of whoever sent the super-powered killer – Kaine accepted to remain in Houston and brought Aracely to live with him at his room in the Four Seasons Hotel.

As Aracely recovered and gained strength, she began to form bonds of friendship with Kaine, Donald, Wally and Annabelle Adams, a bartender of the hotel. However, at the same time, she started to manifest strange abilities and a preternatural knowledge of Kaine's location, feelings and thoughts at all times. It also became clear for all that she was unable to recall anything from her past as she suffered some kind of memory loss when she was trafficked.

During an assault at the hotel by a gang dressed all as Santa Clauses, Aracely used a newfound power to induce panic in one of the robbers.

Shortly after that, she began to have recurrent and strange dreams filled with mythological imagery. During the first of these dreams, Aracely saw herself in Aztlan, the semi-mythical paradisaical place where the Aztecs (or Mexica) first stopped after abandoning the legendary Seven Caves in their pilgrimage to the region of Mexico where they would end up founding Tenochtitlan (today beneath Mexico City), almost a thousand years ago. There she meet a coyote animal who told her that the Fifth Era of the world was ending and a new Sixth Creation was coming. She enigmatically responded that Mictlan (the Aztec Underworld) was rising while the background started to devolve into a terrifying death-filled landscape. The coyote metamorphosed back and forth between itself, an old man clad in a black suit with a cane and an oddly-shaped masculine figure who resembled an unidentified Aztec deity. Aracely was told by this being that the Left-Handed Hummingbird would be consumed - and that she was the aforementioned Hummingbird.

Seeking to run, she tripped over two people who she recognized as her parents. Being devoured by a snake, her father warned her that she could not continue alone - that a "champion" was required. Her mother, laying in the ground and pierced by arrows, told her that she was in Mictlan and that Aracely would soon join her. The cryptic scene ends with the Salamander appearing and taking her by the throat. As his flames engulf everything, Aracely wakes up with Annabelle crying at her side (as an unintended effect of her psychic powers acting while she was asleep).

That same night, while she and Kaine were taking a stroll through the park to discuss the dream, its significance and what to do about it, they were met by Carlos Lobo and his sister Esmeralda - crime cartel leaders, human smugglers behind the abduction of Aracely, and werewolves sent with the intent of killing her. During the fight that ensued, the werewolves kill Kaine, who sacrifices to give Aracely some time to escape.

The Lobo siblings pursued savagely after Aracely, who used her mind powers and trickery to evade them for a while. When the Lobo managed to catch her, they revealed that Aracely was rumored to be the reincarnation of the Aztec god of war, Huitzilopochtli and "the most dangerous of them all". Esmeralda considered the possibility of using Aracely to their favor, but Carlos refused the idea of going against the wishes of "the trickster" because he had "returned them their powers" and could revive their missing brother Eduardo. They are interrupted by a vicious gang of thugs called "the Sharks", whose territory Aracely has cleverly lead them to. The thugs proceed to brawl with the werewolves while Aracely manipulates emotions to exacerbate the fight. The plan worked for while until the Lobo finally gained the upper hand.

Opting to hide inside a trash container, Aracely, struck with fear, finally remembered a scene from her past. Months ago, the Cartel was filling another truck with people that they intended to deliver to the Roxxon Corporation. However, at the behest of a mysterious old man called Mr. Moctezuma (sharply dressed and always in the company of a coyote animal), the Cartel let a girl be placed at the last minute: Aracely. Before being uploaded, she confronted Mr. Moctezuma - the same man that would later appear in her dream - and questioned him about her parents' whereabouts. He answered that her parents had asked him to do this, that she would go to a "better place" and that they would be joining her there. Then, at his command, Aracely was put inside with the other people and then the truck was purposefully left under the desert sun so its occupants would be cooked alive inside the metallic container before departing for Houston. During this ordeal, she heard a voice that stated that she would survive and that then she "would make the world bleed".

Meanwhile, the werewolves siblings tracked Aracely through her scent. They found her hiding spot and captured her, concluding this time that she was too much trouble and should just proceed to kill her. However, they were again interrupted, this time by Kaine, who had accepted The Other to help Aracely and come back reborn as a spider monster. The spider-creature Kaine fought and maimed one of the two werewolves, forcing them to flee. He then attacked Aracely until she was able to use her mental powers and appeal to his self to bring him back. Kaine broke out of the husk of the spider-creature completely healed of all scars but still carrying the Other inside him. Kaine is then emotionally distressed at what he was just about to do. However, Aracely tells him that she cannot be afraid of him and that she knows what he really is. It is then that Aracely proclaims him as her "champion", a title that is not merely affective but also has a deeper meaning as hinted by her father's words and the strange portents with cryptic Aztec mythic symbolism in her dreams.

As their lives returned to normality, Aracely continued to have other dreams and manifested another power during one of them: self-levitation.

She created a costume and adopted the codename "Hummingbird" when helping Kaine in his mission to kill Wolverine, in order to pay a coerced debt to the Assassins Guild. Using her powers to enter the Jean Grey School for mutants, she got mind-scanned by Rachel Grey which triggered a strange reaction: a voice came from Hummingbird stating "I am Huitzilopochtli. I bring Fire to destroy the Dark. And I require blood!". As she said those words, all the telepaths in the school were temporarily brought down with pain - Rachel Grey being the most affected, declaring that Hummingbird's mind was "on fire". Unable to stop this effect herself, it only ended when Iceman slowed down Hummingbird's brain activity with his freezing powers.

After Kaine momentarily killed Wolverine and the fight with the X-Men ended, Aracely submitted herself to a series of analysis by Beast (comics)|Dr. Beast and Dr. Cecilia Reyes while Wolverine and Kaine went out to deal with the Assassins Guild. These tests discarded the possibility of Aracely being a mutant, but established the possibility that she was "not the only person" inhabiting her brain.

When Kaine decided to abandon both Houston and his Scarlet Spider identity, he and Aracely moved to Mexico in order to discover more about Aracely's origin and find her parents. There, on a stop in the city of Monterrey, she helped him bring down drug dealers in order to steal the criminals' money and finance their search.

New Warriors

Powers and abilities
She appears to have some kind of psychic power similar to Madame Web's. Being able to detect other people's feelings, thoughts and locate them wherever they are. However, she is also able to manipulate emotions and cause severe feats of fear and panic in her opponents - even specific kinds of fear (like arachnophobia). She has demonstrated the capacity to project her own thoughts into the minds of others to communicate with them.

In relation to the aforementioned, she possesses some sort of special "connection" with Kaine, being able to read and sense him even from great distances. Practically, no thought of his is hidden from her. The exception being the occasions when Kaine is dominated by the Other and transforms into a spider monster.

She can levitate (or "float"), which she can use to remain far off the ground during battle, carry team members through obstacles or going so far as to apparently remain in the air without moving, usually in an upside-down lotus position (even while sleeping).

She has once invoked and hurtled sacred fire at an aggressive demon ("The Hand of Chthon") when this one tried to possess Thor, burning him to death. However, she was overcome in that moment by Huitzilopochtli and had no memory of the event after it concluded. Haechi, who observed the whole thing, described it as Hummingbird becoming fire.

Additionally, she appears to be able to learn any language from other people's minds via telepathy. Besides her native Spanish, she has demonstrated fluency in French, Japanese, English (which she apparently didn't know before suddenly start talking it) and more recently Romanian.

The full extent of and number of her abilities and powers is unknown at the moment as well as the exact nature behind them, other than they appear to involve magic energies of some kind; according to the High Evolutionary, Hummingbird "reeks of magic".

References

External links

 Hummingbirds at Marvel Wiki

2012 comics debuts
Comics characters introduced in 2012
Marvel Comics sidekicks
Marvel Comics female superheroes
Mexican superheroes
Fictional characters with fire or heat abilities
Fictional goddesses